Gurteen is a village in East County Galway, Ireland. The Irish translation of Gurteen translates as "Little Ploughed Field". Gurteen is a half-parish of the Ballymacward-Gurteen parish. The nearest towns are Athenry and Mountbellew. 

The patron saint of Gurteen is Saint Kerrill. Saint Kerrill's Well is located at the very southern tip of the parish in Gortnalone, near neighbouring Attymon. Saint Kerrill's Abbey is in Clonkeenkerrill with Clonkeenkerrill Graveyard. Saint Kerrill's feast day is held every year on 13 June. The Roman Catholic church in Gurteen is named after a local priest, Father Michael Griffin, who was shot dead on the night of 14 November 1920, most likely by Auxiliaries. The Galway Minor Hurling Championship trophy is named in honour of Father Griffin. The Éire Óg-Father Griffins GAA Club based in Galway City is also named in his honour.

Located in East Galway, Gurteen is a rural area with a public house (Mitchell's Bar), church (St Michael's) and a primary school. The primary school, Saint Kerrill's NS was opened in 1982, when 3 smaller national schools were merged: Clonkeenkerrill, Shanballard and Tample. The local GAA club is Pádraig Pearse's GAA. Founded in 1966 when the Gurteen and Ballymacward clubs amalgamated, it has playing pitches in Ballymacward and Gurteen. Colemanstown United FC is a soccer club located in the area. Founded in 1982, the club competes in the Galway District Soccer League.

Notable people 

 Father Griffin
 Noel Treacy RIP, TD & Galway GAA County Board Chairman
 Cyril Donnellan, Pádraig Pearse's GAA player and former Galway hurler
 Seán Mac Giollarnáth, Irish folklorist.

See also
List of towns and villages in Ireland

External links 
 http://www.padraigpearsesgalway.com
 http://www.colemanstownunited.com
Towns and villages in County Galway